Karencitta is a Cebuano singer-songwriter and actress.

Filmography

Television

Film

Discography

Studio albums

Singles

As lead artist

Awards and nominations

Notes

References

External links

Cebuano film actresses
Cebuano television actresses
21st-century Cebuano actresses
21st-century Cebuano women singers